General Workers Union in Ivory Coast (in French: Union Générale des Travailleurs de Côte d'Ivoire), a national trade union federation in Ivory Coast. UGTCI was created in 1962 by PDCI, and was to become the sole legal trade union centre of the country for many years.

References

Trade unions in Ivory Coast
International Trade Union Confederation
Organisation of African Trade Union Unity
Trade unions established in 1962
Organizations based in Abidjan
1962 establishments in Ivory Coast